

Fibre Channel 
2005
 FC-SATA (under development)
FC-PI-2 INCITS 404
2004
FC-SP ANSI INCITS 1570-D
FC-GS-4 (Fibre Channel Generic Services)ANSI INCITS 387. Includes the following standards:
 FC-GS-2 ANSI INCITS 288 (1999)
 FC-GS-3 ANSI INCITS 348 (2001)
FC-SW-3 INCITS 384. Includes the following standards:
 FC-SW INCITS 321 (1998)
 FC-SW-2 INCITS 355 (2001)
FC-DA INCITS TR-36. Includes the following standards:
 FC-FLA INCITS TR-20 (1998)
 FC-PLDA INCITS TR-19 (1998)
2003
 FC-FS INCITS 373. Includes the following standards:
 FC-PH ANSI X3.230 (1994)
 FC-PH-2 ANSI X3.297 (1997)
 FC-PH-3 ANSI X3.303 (1998)
 FC-BB-2 INCITS 372
 FC-SB-3 INCITS 374. Replaces:
 FC-SB ANSI X3.271 (1996)
 FC-SB-2 INCITS 374 (2001)
2002
 FC-VI INCITS 357
 FC-MI INCITS/TR-30
 FC-PI INCITS 352
2001
 FC-SB-2 INCITS 374. Replaced by: FC-SB-3 INCITS 374 (2003)
 FC-SW-2 INCITS 355. Replaced by: FC-SW-3 INCITS 384 (2004)
 FC-GS-3 ANSI INCITS 348. Replaced by: FC-GS-4 ANSI INCITS 387 (2004)
1999
 FC-AL-2 INCITS 332
 FC-TAPE INCITS TR-24
 FC-GS-2 ANSI INCITS 288 (1999). Replaced by: FC-GS-4 ANSI INCITS 387 (2004)
1998
 FC-PH-3 ANSI X3.303. Replaced by: FC-FS INCITS 373 (2003)
 FC-FLA INCITS TR-20. Replaced by: FC-DA INCITS TR-36 (2004)
 FC-PLDA INCITS TR-19. Replaced by: FC-DA INCITS TR-36 (2004)
 FC-SW INCITS 321. Replaced by: FC-SW-3 INCITS 384 (2004)
1997
 FC-PH-2 ANSI X3.297. Replaced by: FC-FS INCITS 373
1996
 FC-SB ANSI X3.271. Replaced by: FC-SB-3 INCITS 374
 FC-AL ANSI X3.272
1994
 FC-PH ANSI X3.230. Replaced by: FC-FS INCITS 373 (2003)

Others:
FC-LS: Fibre Channel Link Services
FC-HBA API for Fibre Channel HBA management
FC-GS-3 CT Fibre Channel Global Services Common Transport

RFCs 

  - Transmission of IPv6, IPv4, and Address Resolution Protocol (ARP) Packets over Fibre Channel, 2006
  - Transmission of IPv6 Packets over Fibre Channel (Obsoleted by: RFC 4338)
  - IP and ARP over Fibre Channel (Obsoleted by: RFC 4338)
  - Securing Block Storage Protocols over IP

SNMP-related specifications 

RFCs
  - MIB for Fibre-Channel Security Protocols (FC-SP)
  - Fibre Channel Registered State Change Notification (RSCN) MIB
  - Fibre-Channel Zone Server MIB
  - Fibre-Channel Fabric Configuration Server MIB
  - The Virtual Fabrics MIB
  - MIB for Fibre Channel's Fabric Shortest Path First (FSPF) Protocol
  - Fibre Channel Routing Information MIB
  - Fibre Channel Fabric Address Manager MIB
  - Fibre-Channel Name Server MIB
  - Definitions of Managed Objects for Internet Fibre Channel Protocol iFCP
  - Fibre Channel Management MIB
  - Definitions of Managed Objects for the Fabric Element in Fibre Channel Standard (Obsoleted by: RFC 4044)

References

Fibre Channel
Fibre Channel standards
Fibre Channel